East Flattop Mountain is located in the Lewis Range, Glacier National Park in the U.S. state of Montana. East Flattop Mountain rises to the north above Saint Mary Lake and is easily seen from the eastern entrance to the Going-to-the-Sun Road and the village of St. Mary, Montana.

See also
 Mountains and mountain ranges of Glacier National Park (U.S.)

References

Mountains of Glacier County, Montana
Mountains of Glacier National Park (U.S.)
Lewis Range
Mountains of Montana